Julianne Nicholson (born July 1, 1971) is an American actress. She is best known for her roles in the film August: Osage County (2013) and the television series Law & Order: Criminal Intent (2006–2009), Masters of Sex (2013–2014), Eyewitness (2016), and Mare of Easttown (2021), the lattermost of which earned her a Primetime Emmy Award.

Nicholson's other notable credits include Tully (2000), Ally McBeal (2001–2002), Kinsey (2004), Conviction (2006), Boardwalk Empire (2011–2013), Black Mass (2015), I, Tonya (2017), Togo (2019), The Outsider (2020), and Blonde (2022).

Early life
Nicholson was born and raised in Medford, Massachusetts (outside Boston), the daughter of Kate (née Gilday) and James O. Nicholson Jr. She is the eldest of four children.

After graduating from Arlington Catholic High School, she modeled in New York for six months, quit for a year, then resumed her modeling career in Paris for another six months. After returning to New York, she attended Hunter College as a general studies major for two years. While in New York, Nicholson supported herself by waitressing and eventually left school to study acting and begin her professional career.

Career

Film
In her first feature film role, Nicholson starred opposite Michael Caine and James Spader in the Peter Yates film Curtain Call. Later she won what proved to be both her breakthrough and favorite role as a headstrong young feminist in Peter Chan's The Love Letter. She has worked with other international directors in films such Alain Berliner's Passion of Mind, and Nick Hurran's Little Black Book. Nicholson's domestic drama credits include William Vincent, Staten Island, Brief Interviews with Hideous Men, Tully, Kinsey, and August: Osage County, for which the ensemble cast was nominated for several awards. Her domestic comedy credits include Seeing Other People, Puccini For Beginners, and Disney's Togo opposite Willem Dafoe.

Television
Among Nicholson's television credits are a supporting role in the television miniseries Storm of the Century and guest-starring roles in ER and Law & Order. She was tapped by Steven Spielberg for the lead role in the paranormal drama The Others. In late 2001, Nicholson became one of the main cast members of the hit show Ally McBeal, portraying Jenny Shaw for 13 episodes. She worked on the medical drama Presidio Med and the HBO pilot Marriage. Julianne worked on the short-lived NBC television drama, Conviction and in what is her best known role, as Megan Wheeler, in the sixth season of Law & Order: Criminal Intent. Nicholson has said her favorite Criminal Intent episode was "Weeping Willow". As of the Criminal Intent episode "Major Case", Nicholson departed the series when she went on maternity leave for the birth of her second child (which was written into the show as the birth of her first child).

In 2011, she guest-starred on Royal Pains as "Jess", one of Dr. Lawson's patients, who has panic attacks. She also appeared on Boardwalk Empire as the recurring character of U.S. Assistant Attorney General Esther Randolph (a character based on the real life Mabel Walker Willebrandt) that same year. In 2012, she guest-starred on The Good Wife as Callie Simko, an attorney who has an interest in Will Gardner.

On October 16, 2016, Nicholson played the lead role of Sheriff Helen Torrance in USA Network's 10-episode police drama, Eyewitness.

In 2021, Nicholson starred in the HBO series Mare of Easttown as Lori Ross, best friend of the titular Mare Sheehan, played by Kate Winslet. The series proved to be a ratings hit for HBO, breaking viewership records. Her role in the series brought her critical acclaim, with critics especially highlighting her harrowing performance in the series finale. The role won Nicholson her first Primetime Emmy Award for Outstanding Supporting Actress in a Limited Series. She also earned a nomination at the Critics Choice Awards for the same role.

Theater
Nicholson has been in a number of plays in New York. Her work in theater includes plays written by Craig Lucas, Adam Rapp, and Sam Shepard.

Personal life
In 2004, she married British actor Jonathan Cake in Italy; they met playing a couple on an unaired HBO pilot called Marriage. They have two children, son Ignatius Cake and daughter Phoebe Margaret Cake.

Acting credits 
Key
 Denotes works that have not yet been released

Film

Television

Theatre

References

External links
 
 

Actresses from Boston
Actresses from Massachusetts
American film actresses
American television actresses
Hunter College alumni
Living people
People from Medford, Massachusetts
20th-century American actresses
21st-century American actresses
Outstanding Performance by a Supporting Actress in a Miniseries or Movie Primetime Emmy Award winners
1971 births
Arlington Catholic High School alumni